Vital Henrique Batista Soares (13 November 1874 – 19 April 1933) was a Brazilian lawyer and politician.

Soares was born in Valença, Bahia.  He served as a president of Bahia from 1928 to 1930.

He was elected Vice President of Brazil on 1 March 1930 but was prevented from taking office by a coup that brought Getúlio Vargas to power, just three weeks before scheduled inauguration along with President-elect Júlio Prestes.

Soares died in Salvador, Bahia, aged 58.

References

Vice presidents of Brazil
1874 births
1933 deaths
Governors of Bahia

Candidates for Vice President of Brazil